is a railway station in the city of Iwakura, Aichi Prefecture, Japan, operated by Meitetsu.

Lines

Station layout
The station has two island platforms connected by an underground passage. The station has automated ticket machines, Manaca automated turnstiles and is unattended.

Platforms

Adjacent stations

|-
!colspan=5|Nagoya Railroad

Station history
Iwakura Station was opened on 6 August 1912. From September 1920 to April 1964, a spur line connected the Inuyama Line with Komaki Station. A new station building was opened in September 1965 and was expanded from 2004 to 2005.

Passenger statistics
In fiscal 2017, the station was used by an average of 24,535 passengers daily.

Surrounding area
Iwakura City Hall

See also
 List of Railway Stations in Japan

References

External links

 Official web page 

Railway stations in Japan opened in 1912
Railway stations in Aichi Prefecture
Stations of Nagoya Railroad
Iwakura, Aichi